Saemangeum Development and Investment Agency (Korean: 새만금개발청; Hanja: 新萬金開發廳, SDIA) is an organisation under Ministry of Land, Infrastructure and Transport responsible for planning, management and investment recruitment of Saemangeum. It was founded in 2013 and is currently located in Gunsan. The Agency is led by vice-ministerial-level administrator.

Unlike many other government organisations which are founded by the Government Organization Act, the Agency is founded by the special law exclusively dealt with Saemangeum project. Hence, the agency solely deals with issues related to and within the Saemangeum area.

It works closely with two organisations under Prime Minister's Office established by the same law, Saemangeum Committee composed of high-ranking government officials and experts and Saemangeum Project Support Bureau composed of bureaucrats.

The Agency is administering the area that was previously managed by Seamangeum Gunsan Free Economic Zone Authority from 2008. The special law re-organised the management of the region and created the Agency whilst the Authority was dissolved later in 2018.

In 2017 the Agency successfully recruited 2023 World Scout Jamboree event in Saemangeum.

History 

 September 2013: SDIA founded under Ministry of Land, Infrastructure and Transport
 December 2018: moved its headquarters to current location in Gunsan

See also 

 Saemangeum
 Saemangeum Seawall

References

External links
Official English website

Government agencies of South Korea